Victor Dubowitz, FRCP, Hon FRCPCH (born 6 August 1931) is a British neurologist and professor emeritus at Imperial College London. He is principally known along with his wife Lilly Dubowitz for developing two clinical tests, the Dubowitz Score to estimate gestational age and the other for the systematic neurological examination of the newborn.

Life
Dubowitz is the son of Charley Dubowitz and Olga née Schattel. He was educated in Beaufort West Central High School in South Africa. Dubowitz graduated Doctor of Medicine from the University of Cape Town in 1954, and moved to the United Kingdom in April 1954 to gain some clinical experience, and culture and theatre. Dubowitz planned to return to South Africa after 18 months and return to general practice there, but never did, as he encountered Sir Francis Fraser at the Royal Postgraduate Medical School who directed him into a position at University Hospital Lewisham working as an ophthalmology locum. He later took another locum position at New End Hospital in Hampstead.

Two medical conditions are named after him, Dubowitz syndrome, a rare genetic disorder characterized by microcephaly, growth retardation and a characteristic facial appearance of unknown genetic cause; and Dubowitz disease, a particular form of spinal muscular atrophy, a severe neuromuscular disorder affecting mainly infants and children.

A medical and research institution at the Great Ormond Street Hospital for Children in London, bears his name (the Dubowitz Neuromuscular Centre).

Dubowitz married Lilly Magdalena Suzanne née Sebők in July 1960, who was also a paediatrician. They had four children, all boys, David born 1963, Michael born 1964, Gerald born 1965, and Daniel born 1969.

Career
Dubowitz started his clinical career in 1954, after graduating in medicine, as a resident in medicine and surgery at Groote Schuur Hospital, for the standard 6 months period in each specialisation. Dubowitz started his UK clinical career in 1958 with 3 week locum position at Queen Mary's Hospital where he saw his first case of Muscular dystrophy in two wards of patients, he became a paediatric resident a subject where he been involved in clinical and research aspects of muscle diseases ever since. He remained at this position for two years before becoming a lecturer and a houseman for a year as a clinical pathologist at the National Hospital for Nervous Diseases, later called National Hospital for Neurology and Neurosurgery, performing muscle biopsies. An interest in research followed, studying for an MD thesis on muscular dystrophy in childhood, in 1960 at the University of Sheffield, where he would eventually stay for the next 13 years. Ronald Illingworth was Dubowitz's professor at Sheffield. Between 1961 and 1965, he was employed as a senior lecturer in child health, and Senior House Officer in hospital and was promoted to Dr.phil at the University of Sheffield. The thesis was based on Dubowitz's pioneering histochemical studies and sponsored by Professor Everson Pearse, on developing and diseased muscle. He continued in that position for another two years before being promoted to a reader in Child Health and Developmental Neurology, at Sheffield, a position Dubowitz held until 1972.  In 1973, Dubowitz applied and received the Chair of Paediatrics and Neonatal Medicine at the Postgraduate Medical School of Hammersmith Hospital, now part of Imperial College London. A large number of researchers followed Dubowitz to the unit, which eventually became the Jerry Lewis Muscle Research Lab, after the building was funded by the Muscular Dystrophy Association. Jerry Lewis actually came an open the unit.

Dubowitz was a founding member of the British Paediatric Neurology Association and the president from 1992 to 1994.

In 1996, Dubowitz was made professor emeritus of paediatrics at the University of London. Dubowitz was honorary member of the European Paediatric Neurology Society since 2005. Dubowitz was president of the Medical Art Society from 1997 to 2000. From 1972 to 1996, Dubowitz was the director of Muscle Research Centre. From 1999 to 2003 Dubowitz was president and later honorary member European Neuromuscular Centre in The Netherlands. From 1972 to the present,  Dubowitz has been an honorary consultant paediatrician at the Hammersmith Hospital.

Dubowitz syndrome

The syndrome that eventually became the Dubowitz syndrome was first described in 1965. Dubowitz held a clinic in cystic fibrosis and noticed 
a baby girl born at full term at Jessop Hospital who weighed around 3 to 4lbs. Dubowitz commented that the baby had an unusually shaped face, recessive and it’s an unusual face, with odd ears and a particular nose, and doesn’t quite fit in and the mother commented that her previous child had a similar shaped face. Dubowitz being interested in the case, through his cystic fibrosis clinic, researched all the different face shapes within syndromes of dwarfism and found that none matched. Dubowitz decided to write a Case report, that was published in the British Journal of Genetics. Then geneticist, John M. Opitz, noticed a similar case in a baby girl in Germany, and published an identical case. Opitz stated that they had identical features, and could almost be sister. From that point on the condition eventually became the Dubowitz syndrome.

World Muscle Society

The idea for the World Muscle Society began in 1995, when Dubowitz discussed the formation of a new society with the pediatrician Luciano Merlini, principally due to the quickening of medical advances in the field and it was felt that the interval between the 4-year meetings of the World Federation of Neurology was too long. Dubowitz felt that a new multidisciplinary society was needed that would meet frequently and focus more on the current research community rather than established figures in the medical community. Dubowitz further discussed the proposal with Italian pediatrician Giovanni Nigro  and later with the French pediatrician George Serratrice in Marseille while travelling.

The name World Muscle Society was finally chosen as it was the most easily recognisable name.  The society was legally established in London. Dubowitz wrote to 60 potential members asking the following two questions:

do you think there is a need a for a new international muscle society to arrange more frequent interdisciplinary meetings; and would you be able to attend a foundation meeting of the new society in London on Sunday 4th June, 1995?

15 people replied and attended the first meeting in London on Sunday 4 June 1995.

Awards

1987 — Jean Hunter Prize of the Royal College of Physicians.
1980 — Commander of the Order of Constantine the Great
1982 — Arvo Ylppö Gold Medal, Finland.
1991 — Gaetano Conte Gold Medal, Italy.
1997 — Cornelia de Lange Medal, The Netherlands.
2007 — James Spence Gold Medal, Royal College of Paediatrics and Child Health
2009 — Inaugural Gold Medal, Jennifer Trust for Spinal Muscular Atrophy
2011 — Peter Emil Becker Prize, German Paediatric Neurology Society.

References

1931 births
Living people
British neurologists
Recipients of the Order of Saints George and Constantine
Recipients of the James Spence Medal
University of Cape Town alumni
People from Beaufort West
Academics of the University of Sheffield
Academics of Imperial College London
Fellows of the Royal College of Physicians